The 2009–10 Danish Cup was the 56th season of the Danish football cup competition. For the second year, the sponsor of the competition was Ekstra Bladet, a daily newspaper, who signed a 3-year contract with the Danish Football Association (DBU) in 2008, making the official name Ekstra Bladet Cup 2009–10.

The competition opened on 8 August 2009 with the First Round and concluded in May 2010 with the Final, held at Parken Stadium.

First round

In this round entered 95 teams. Due to the odd number of clubs, one club, FC Fyn, received a bye to the Second Round. There were 47 matches in the First Round, taking place between 8–19 August 2009.

Second round

The clubs who placed 5–10 in the 2008–09 Superliga – Randers, AGF, AaB, Nordsjælland, Esbjerg, SønderjyskE – as well as the top two clubs from the 2008–09 First Division – Herfølge, who was merged with another club to form Køge for the 2009–10 season, and Silkeborg – received a bye into the second round.

Third round

The top four teams from the 2008–09 Superliga – Copenhagen, OB, Brøndby, and Midtjylland – received a bye into the third round.

Fourth round

The sixteen winners in Round 3 took part in Round 4. The draw occurred on September 25, 2009. The matches took place on October 28, 2009.

Quarter-finals
The draw for the Quarter-final round took place on 30 October 2009. Hobro IK from the Danish 2nd Division (3rd tier) is the lowest ranked team left at this stage.

Semi-finals
The sixth round, the semi-finals, are played as a two-legged tie. The legs were played on 21, 22, 28 and 29 April 2010.

|}

Final

The final was played on 13 May.

References

External links
 Official results at Danish FA official website

2009-10
2009–10 domestic association football cups
Cup